This article contains information about the literary events and publications of 1949.

Events

January 11 – Bertolt Brecht's play Mother Courage and Her Children (Mutter Courage und ihre Kinder), 1939, is first performed in Germany, at the Deutsches Theater in East Berlin, with his wife Helene Weigel in the title role and staged with his Verfremdungseffekt ("distancing effect"). This marks the origin of the Berliner Ensemble.
January 19 – The Poe Toaster first appears, at the grave of Edgar Allan Poe.
January 31 – Late Night Serial, a pilot for the U.K. radio series Book at Bedtime, begins on the BBC Light Programme with a reading of John Buchan's novel The Three Hostages.
February – Théâtre du Rideau Vert, the first professional French-language theatre in Canada, gives its first performance.
February 10 – Arthur Miller's tragedy Death of a Salesman opens at the Morosco Theatre on Broadway in New York City with Lee J. Cobb in the title rôle of Willy Loman. It will run for 742 performances.
March – Poet Pablo Neruda flees Chile over the Lilpela Pass through the Andes to Argentina on horseback carrying a manuscript of his Canto General.
April 14
Roy Campbell punches Stephen Spender on the nose at a poetry reading in London.
N'Ko alphabet devised by Solomana Kante as a writing system and literary language for the Manding languages of West Africa.
May – Welsh poet Dylan Thomas and his wife Caitlin settle at the Boat House, Laugharne, in South Wales.
June 8 – George Orwell's dystopian novel Nineteen Eighty-Four is published in London by Secker & Warburg.
June 
Oxford University Dramatic Society production of Shakespeare's The Tempest beside Worcester College lake, directed by Nevill Coghill.
The final part of Jean-Paul Sartre's Les Chemins de la Liberté (The Roads to Freedom) trilogy is published. A projected fourth volume is never completed.
Summer
The first Cheltenham Literature Festival is held in England, so making it the longest-running event of its kind in the world.
Street & Smith ceases to publish its pulp magazines in the United States.
October – Publication begins in Italy of L'inferno di Topolino, a graphic parody of Dante's Inferno featuring Mickey Mouse with text and verse by Guido Martina.
October 5 – American writer Helene Hanff writes her first letter from New York City to the London antiquarian book dealers Marks & Co, a correspondence eventually collected as 84, Charing Cross Road.
October 13 – George Orwell marries Sonia Brownell while confined in University College Hospital, London, where he will die three months later.
unknown dates
Arthur C. Clarke becomes an assistant editor of Science Abstracts.
Radclyffe Hall's lesbian novel The Well of Loneliness, convicted of obscenity in the United Kingdom on first publication in 1928, is republished in the UK posthumously by Falcon Press, with no legal challenge made against it.
A statue of the folk poet Larin Paraske is erected in Helsinki.
Enid Blyton's children's books – Little Noddy Goes to Toyland, the first to introduce the title character, and The Secret Seven, first in the eponymous series – are published in the UK.

New books

Fiction
Ilse Aichinger – "Spiegelgeschichte" (Mirror Story, serialized short story)
Nelson Algren – The Man with the Golden Arm
Miguel Ángel Asturias – Men of Maize (Hombres de maíz)
Nigel Balchin – A Sort of Traitors
Antoine Blondin – L'Europe buissonnière (Europe Playing Truant)
Heinrich Böll – The Train Was on Time (Der Zug war pünktlich)
Jorge Luis Borges – The Aleph (El Aleph), short stories
Paul Bowles – The Sheltering Sky
Fredric Brown – The Screaming Mimi
Pearl S. Buck – The Angry Wife
Dorothy Bussy (anonymous) – Olivia
Taylor Caldwell – Let Love Come Last
Italo Calvino – The Crow Comes Last (Ultimo viene il corvo), short stories
Victor Canning – The Golden Salamander
Alejo Carpentier – The Kingdom of this World (El reino de este mundo)
John Dickson Carr
Below Suspicion
A Graveyard To Let (as Carter Dickson)
Peter Cheyney 
 One of Those Things
 You Can Call It a Day
Agatha Christie – Crooked House
Howard Clewes – Green Grow the Rushes
Freeman Wills Crofts – Silence for the Murderer
Cecil Day-Lewis – Head of a Traveller
R. F. Delderfield – Seven Men of Gascony
H. F. Ellis – The Papers of A. J. Wentworth B. A.
Foster Fitzsimmons – Bright Leaf
Anthony Gilbert – Death Knocks Three Times
Winston Graham – Cordelia
Graham Greene – The Third Man
A. B. Guthrie, Jr. – The Way West
Knut Hamsun – On Overgrown Paths (Paa gjengrodde Stier)
L. P. Hartley – The Boat
John Hawkes – Cannibal
Alfred Hayes – The Girl on the Via Flaminia
William Heinesen – The Black Cauldron (Den sorte gryde)
Robert A. Heinlein - "Red Planet"
Georgette Heyer – Arabella
Hammond Innes – The White South
Shirley Jackson – The Lottery and Other Stories
Alaric Jacob – Scenes from a Bourgeois Life
Dagmar Lange – Mördaren ljuger inte ensam (The Murderer is Not the Only Liar)
Marghanita Laski – Little Boy Lost
 E. C. R. Lorac 
 Policemen in the Precinct
 Still Waters
H. P. Lovecraft – Something About Cats and Other Pieces
Ross Macdonald – The Moving Target
Ngaio Marsh – Swing Brother Swing
Ana María Matute – Luciérnagas
Robert Merle – Week-end at Zuydcoote (Week-end à Zuydcoote)
Yukio Mishima (三島 由紀夫) – Confessions of a Mask (仮面の告白)
Gladys Mitchell – Tom Brown's Body
Nancy Mitford – Love in a Cold Climate
Vilhelm Moberg – The Emigrants (Utvandrarna), first in The Emigrants (novel series)
C. L. Moore – Beyond Earth's Gates
Stratis Myrivilis – Η Παναγιά η Γοργόνα (E Panayia e Yoryona, The Mermaid Madonna)
Máirtín Ó Cadhain – Cré na Cille (Graveyard Clay)
John O'Hara – A Rage to Live
George Orwell – Nineteen Eighty-Four
Karel Poláček – There Were Five of Us (Bylo nás pět)
Samuel Putnam (translator) – Don Quixote
Ellery Queen – Cat of Many Tails
Ernest Raymond – Gentle Greaves
Harold Robbins – The Dream Merchants
 Rafael Sabatini – The Gamester
Jack Schaefer – Shane
Anna Seghers – The Dead Stay Young (Die Toten Bleiben Jung)
Nevil Shute – A Town Like Alice
Emma Smith – The Far Cry
Rex Stout
The Second Confession
Trouble in Triplicate
Cecil Street 
 Blackthorn House
 Up the Garden Path
Edward Streeter – Father of the Bride
 Julian Symons – Bland Beginning
Gwyn Thomas – All Things Betray Thee
Arved Viirlaid – Tormiaasta (The Year of Storms)
Mika Waltari – The Wanderer (Mikael Hakim)
Jiří Weil – Life With a Star (Život s hvězdou)
Paul Winterton – Came the Dawn
S. Fowler Wright – The Throne of Saturn (short stories)
Frank Yerby – Pride's Castle

Children and young people
Marguerite de Angeli – The Door in the Wall
Rev. W. Awdry – Tank Engine Thomas Again (fourth in The Railway Series of 42 books by him and his son Christopher Awdry)
Carl Barks – Lost in the Andes! (comic-book story starring Donald Duck)
Enid Blyton
Noddy Goes to Toyland
The Secret Seven
The Rockingdown Mystery
Ruby Ferguson – Jill's Gymkhana (first in Jill series of nine books)
Janet and John (first in the series of early readers)
Robert A. Heinlein - "Red Planet"
Astrid Lindgren – Most Beloved Sister (Allrakäraste syster) (in Nils Karlsson-Pyssling: sagor)
Clare Mallory – Juliet Overseas
Ruth Park – Poor Man's Orange
Willard Price – Amazon Adventure (first in The Adventure Series)
H. E. Todd – Bobby Brewster and the Winkers' Club (first in the Bobby Brewster series of 24 books)
Geoffrey Trease – No Boats on Bannermere (first in a series of five set in Cumberland)
Meriol Trevor – The Forest and the Kingdom (first in World Dionysius trilogy)

Drama
Ugo Betti – Corruzione al Palazzo di giustizia (Corruption in the Palace of Justice, written 1944, first performed)
Maurice Clavel – La Terrasse de midi
T. S. Eliot – The Cocktail Party
Christopher Fry – The Lady's Not for Burning
Jean Genet – Deathwatch (Haute Surveillance)
 Val Gielgud – Party Manners
 Hugh Hastings – Seagulls Over Sorrento
Ronald Jeans – Young Wives' Tale
Sidney Kingsley – Detective Story
Eric Linklater – Love in Albania
 Alan Melville 
 Castle in the Air
 Top Secret
Arthur Miller – Death of a Salesman
Pablo Picasso – The Four Little Girls (Les Quatre petites filles), first published version
Lynn Riggs – Out of Dust
Nelson Rodrigues – Dorotéia
Talbot Rothwell – Queen Elizabeth Slept Here
Aimée Stuart – Lace on Her Petticoat

Poetry
Carlos de Oliveira – Descida aos Infernos
Robert Frost – Complete Poems of Robert Frost
Máirtín Ó Direáin – Rogha Dánta
Octavio Paz – Libertad bajo palabra

Non-fiction
Marc Bloch – Apologie pour l'histoire, ou, Métier d'historien (translated as The Historian's Craft, 1953)
Fernand Braudel – La Méditerranée et le monde Méditerranéen à l'époque de Philippe II (The Mediterranean and the Mediterranean World in the Age of Philip II)
Herbert Butterfield
Christianity and History
Origins of Modern Science
Joseph Campbell – The Hero with a Thousand Faces
John Dickson Carr – The Life of Sir Arthur Conan Doyle
Thomas B. Costain – The Conquering Family (also The Conquerors, first book in Plantagenet Series)
Simone de Beauvoir – The Second Sex (Le Deuxième Sexe)
Dion Fortune (died 1946) – The Cosmic Doctrine
Benjamin Graham – The Intelligent Investor
John Gunther – Death Be Not Proud
Jean Hugard and Frederick Braue – The Royal Road To Card Magic
John Maynard Keynes (died 1946) – Two Memoirs
Osbert Lancaster – Drayneflete Revealed (architectural satire)
Aldo Leopold – A Sand County Almanac
Margaret Mead – Male and Female
Robert Michels – Political Parties (Zür Soziologie des Parteiwesens in der modernen Demokratie, 2nd ed., 1925)
Audie Murphy – To Hell and Back
P. D. Ouspensky – In Search of the Miraculous
Amber Reeves – Ethics for Unbelievers
Finn Ronne – Antarctic Conquest
Gilbert Ryle – The Concept of Mind
Robert Lewis Taylor – W. C. Fields: His Follies and Fortunes
Max Weber – The Methodology of the Social Sciences

Births
January 1
Olivia Goldsmith, American author (died 2004)
Radu Țuculescu, Romanian novelist, dramatist and theater director
January 12 – Haruki Murakami (村上 春樹), Japanese novelist
January 16 – John Guy, Australian-born British historian and biographer
January 26 – Jonathan Carroll, American author of fantasy fiction
January 27 – Ethan Mordden, American author
February 4 – Mark D. Devlin, American memoirist (died 2005)
February 23 – César Aira, Argentinian writer
March 22 – Brian Hanrahan, English journalist (died 2010)
March 26 – Patrick Süskind, German novelist
April 11 – Dorothy Allison, American novelist and campaigner
April 25 – James Fenton, English journalist, poet, critic and academic
May 25 – Jamaica Kincaid, Antiguan-born novelist
June 5 – Ken Follett, English novelist
June 14 – Harry Turtledove, American novelist
June 21 – John Agard, Guyanese poet
July 1 – Denis Johnson, American poet, novelist (Tree of Smoke) and short story writer ("Jesus' Son") (died 2017)
July 5 – Jill Murphy, English children's writer and illustrator (died 2021)
July 15 – Richard Russo, American Pulitzer Prize-winning novelist
August 3 – Peter Gutmann, American journalist
August 25 – Martin Amis, English novelist and critic
September – Jimmy McGovern, English screenwriter
September 10 – Bill O'Reilly, American journalist and author
September 13 – Linda Colley, English historian
September 26 – Jane Smiley, American novelist
October 4 – Luis Sepúlveda, Chilean author and journalist (died 2020)
October 5 – Peter Ackroyd, English biographer, novelist and critic
November 2 – Lois McMaster Bujold, American author of science fiction and fantasy
November 24 – Erwin Neutzsky-Wulff, Danish philosopher
December 6 – Élmer Mendoza, Mexican fiction writer
December 9 – Eileen Myles, American poet
December 22 – David Gilmour, Canadian novelist
December 24 – Alberto Pérez-Gómez, Mexican-born architectural historian

Deaths
January 15 – Mary Lewis Langworthy, American pageant writer (born 1872)
January 21 – William Price Drury, English novelist, playwright and officer (born 1861)
February 1 – N. D. Cocea, Romanian novelist, critic and journalist (born 1880)
February 11 – Axel Munthe, Swedish autobiographer and psychiatrist (born 1857)
March 2 
 Alberto Gerchunoff, Argentine writer (born 1883)
 Sarojini Naidu, Indian poet and politician (born 1879)
May 6 – Maurice Maeterlinck, Belgian poet, playwright and Nobel Laureate (born 1862)
May 21 – Klaus Mann, German-born American novelist (overdose, born 1906)
June 10 – Sigrid Undset, Norwegian author and Nobel Laureate (born 1882)
June 11 – Oton Župančič, Slovene poet, translator and dramatist (born 1878)
June 14 – Russell Doubleday, American author and publisher (born 1872)
July 2 – Elsa Bernstein (Ernst Rosmer), German dramatist (born 1866)
August 2 – Hermann Grab, Bohemian German-language novelist (born 1903)
August 8 – E. H. Young, English novelist (born 1880)
August 16 – Margaret Mitchell, American novelist (road accident, born 1900)
September 4 – Herbert Eulenberg, German poet and dramatist (born 1876)
September 6 – Lucien Descaves, French novelist (born 1861)
September 19
Will Cuppy, American humorist (born 1884)
George Shiels, Irish dramatist (born 1881)
September 21 – Jorge Cáceres, Chilean poet and artist (born 1923)
October 20 – Jacques Copeau, French actor and dramatist (born 1879)
October 24
Thomas Rowland Hughes, Welsh-language novelist, dramatist and poet (multiple sclerosis, born 1903)
Yaroslav Halan, Ukrainian playwright, translator, and publicist (homicide, born 1902)
December 7 – Rex Beach, American author (born 1877)
December 12 – Harriet Ford, American actress and playwright (born 1863)
December 28 – Hervey Allen, American novelist (heart attack, born 1889)

Awards
Carnegie Medal for children's literature: Agnes Allen, The Story of Your Home
James Tait Black Memorial Prize for fiction: Emma Smith, The Far Cry
James Tait Black Memorial Prize for biography: John Connell, W. E. Henley
Newbery Medal for children's literature: Marguerite Henry, King of the Wind
Nobel Prize for literature: William Faulkner
Order of Merit: Bertrand Russell
Premio Nadal: Jose Suárez Carreño, Las últimas horas
Pulitzer Prize for Drama: Arthur Miller, Death of a Salesman
Pulitzer Prize for Fiction: James Gould Cozzens, Guard of Honor
Pulitzer Prize for Poetry: Peter Viereck, Terror and Decorum

References

 
Years of the 20th century in literature